JamJar Investments is a venture capital investment fund, headquartered in London, founded in 2012 by Richard Reed, Jon Wright, Adam Balon, and Katie Marraché (née Leviten).

Reed, Wright, and Balon had previously founded FMCG smoothie brand Innocent Drinks, which was sold to Coca-Cola in 2013 for north of $700m.

JamJar Investments provides investment to early-stage companies in the consumer technology and FMCG sectors.

Previous investments include Farewill, Graze, Deliveroo, Tails.com, Babylon Health, Propercorn, Popchips and Simba Sleep.

In May 2017 Katie Marrache was announced Europe's youngest female VC partner.

JamJar announced a new fund of £100m in April 22.

References

External links 
JamJar Investments official website

Investment companies of the United Kingdom
Privately held companies of the United Kingdom